The Mir Yeshiva (Yeshivas Mir), commonly known as the Mirrer Yeshiva or The Mir, was a Lithuanian yeshiva located in the town of Mir, Russian Empire (now Belarus). After relocating a number of times during World War II, it has evolved into three yeshivas, one in Jerusalem, with a subsidiary campus in Brachfeld, Modi'in Illit, and the other two in Brooklyn, New York: the Mir Yeshiva, and Bais Hatalmud.

Origins
The Mirrer Yeshiva was founded in 1815, 12 years after the founding of the Volozhin Yeshiva, by one of the prominent residents of a small town called Mir (then in Grodno Governorate, Russian Empire), Rabbi Shmuel Tiktinsky. After Rav Shmuel's death, his youngest son, Rabbi Chaim Leib Tiktinsky, was appointed rosh yeshiva. He was succeeded by his son, Rav Avrohom, who brought Rabbi Eliyahu Boruch Kamai into the yeshiva. During Rabbi Kamai's tenure the direction of the yeshiva wavered between those who wished to introduce the study of musar and those who were against it.

In 1903, Rabbi Kamai's daughter Malka married Rabbi Eliezer Yehuda Finkel, son of the legendary Rabbi Nosson Tzvi Finkel, the Elder of Slabodka, who joined the yeshiva faculty in late 1906. Under his influence, the yeshiva joined the musar movement definitively and Rabbi Zalman Dolinsky of Radun was appointed as its first mashgiach.

World War I

With the outbreak of World War I in 1914, the yeshiva moved from Mir to Poltava (now in Ukraine). Following the death of Rabbi Kamai in 1917, Rav Eliezer Yehuda was appointed as rosh yeshiva, ushering in the golden age of the yeshiva. In 1921, The yeshiva moved back to its original facilities in Mir, where it blossomed, attracting the cream of the yeshiva students. The yeshiva's reputation grew, attracting students not only from throughout Europe, but also from America, South Africa and Australia, and the student body grew to close to 500. By the time World War II broke out there was hardly a rosh yeshiva of the Lithuanian school who had not studied in Mir. During this period Rabbi Yeruchom Levovitz joined the yeshiva as mashgiach in succession to Rabbi Zalman Dolinski.

In 1929, one of the yeshiva's most gifted students, Chaim Leib Shmuelevitz ("Chaim Stutchiner"), married the daughter of Rabbi Eliezer Yehuda Finkel. Rabbi Chaim was appointed to the faculty in 1935.

Escape to the East
The invasion of Poland in 1939 by Nazi Germany from the west and the Red Army from the east meant the yeshiva was unable to remain in Mir, which was now under Soviet Communist rule. Many of the foreign-born students left, but the bulk of the yeshiva relocated to Lithuania, which had been overrun by Soviet Russia, but not yet Sovietized. The yeshiva was first re-established in Wilno, and then in Keidan, Lithuania. Not many months elapsed before Lithuania became virtually annexed by Soviet Russia, and the future of the yeshiva was again in peril. The yeshiva was split into four sections: The "first division", under the leadership of Rabbi Chaim Leib Shmuelevitz as rosh yeshiva and Rabbi Yechezkel Levenstein as mashgiach, relocated to Krakinova; the other three divisions went to the three small towns of Ramigola, Shat and Krak. It was obvious, however, that this arrangement was only a temporary solution, and that ultimately the yeshivah would need to flee Soviet-occupied Lithuania in order to survive.  In the summer of 1940, several students of the yeshivah led by Nathan Gutwirth, dutch citizen, learned that the Dutch ambassador in Riga, Leendert de Decker, together with the Dutch consul to Lithuania Jan Zwartendijk were willing to provide them with destination-visas to the Caribbean island of Curaçao. Concurrently, it became known that the Japanese consul in Lithuania, Chiune Sugihara, had agreed to issue transit visas to refugees who wished to escape via the Japanese-occupied Pacific.  As a result of these fortuitous events (seen by many to this day as acts of divine providence) most of the yeshivah students requested and received  several thousand transit-visas from Sugihara, permitting them to depart to the Far East.

In the fall of 1940, the yeshiva students traveled via the trans-Siberian railroad to Vladivostok, Russia; and then by ship to Tsuruga, Japan. The yeshiva reopened in Kobe, Japan in March 1941.

Kobe
While the Yeshiva was in Kobe, a controversy arose as to when to observe the Sabbath.  The opinions of the Chazon Ish and Rav Yechiel Michel Tokachinsky were solicited.  Ultimately, the students refrained from biblical Sabbath violations on two days, but kept it completely on only one of the days.

Several smaller yeshivas managed to escape alongside the Mirrer Yeshiva and, despite the difficulties involved, the leaders of the yeshiva undertook full responsibility for their support, distributing funds (mostly received from the American Jewish Joint Distribution Committee) and securing quarters and food for all the students.

Shanghai

A short time later, Japan expelled the Jews from its mainland, and the yeshiva relocated again, to (Japanese-controlled) Shanghai, China, where they remained until 1947. In Shanghai, Rabbi Meir Ashkenazi, a Lubavitcher chasid who served as the spiritual leader of the Jewish refugees, arranged for the yeshiva to occupy the Beth Aharon Synagogue, built in 1920 by a prominent Jewish Shanghai businessman, Silas Aaron Hardoon. For the first few weeks, until funds could be sourced for provisions, the yeshiva community suffered from malnutrition.

Re-establishment after the war
Following the end of the war, the majority of the Jewish refugees from the Shanghai ghetto left for Israel and the United States. Two deans of the Mir Yeshiva, Rabbi Eliezer Yehuda Finkel and Rabbi Avraham Kalmanowitz, managed to escape from Europe before the war in 1939 and did not accompany the yeshiva to Shanghai.

Rabbi Finkel could not accompany the yeshiva due to health issues, and he therefore traveled by ship through Odessa and Turkey to Eretz Yisrael where he established the Mirrer Yeshiva in Jerusalem, Israel. His son, Rabbi Chaim Zev Finkel, served as mashgiach.

Rabbi Kalmanowitz went to the United States where he worked tirelessly to help the Jews in Europe and Shanghai. He is credited for sending money as well as hundreds of gemaras. In America, he established the Mirrer Yeshiva Central Institute in Rockaway and later moved it to Brooklyn, New York City.  The yeshiva's leaders, Rabbi Shmuelevitz and Rabbi Levenstein, left Shanghai for New York in early 1947 with the last contingent of students. Three months later Rabbi Shmuelevitz  set sail for Eretz Yisrael, where he joined the faculty of the Mirrer Yeshiva that had been established by Rabbi Finkel. Rabbi Levenstein too left soon after his arrival for Israel where he was appointed mashgiach of the Ponevezh Yeshiva.

After their arrival in New York from Shanghai, some of the yeshiva's older and most respected students established the Beth Hatalmud Rabbinical College in Brooklyn, New York, to serve as a continuation of the original yeshiva that went to Shanghai.

Prominent alumni

Prominent faculty

Roshei Yeshivah
 Rabbi Shmuel Tiktinsky (1815- )
 Rabbi Chaim Leib Tiktinsky
 Rabbi Eliyahu Boruch Kamai (? -1917)
 Rabbi Eliezer Yehuda Finkel (1917-1965); (Nosson Tzvi Finkel/The Alter of Slabodka's son and Eliyahu Boruch Kamai's son-in-law)
 Rabbi Chaim Leib Shmuelevitz (1941-1979)
 Rabbi Avraham Kalmanowitz

Mashgichim
 Rabbi Zalman Dolinsky
 Rabbi Yeruchom Levovitz
 Rabbi Yechezkel Levenstein

See also
 History of the Jews in Poland
 History of the Jews in Belarus
 Mir Yeshiva (Jerusalem)

References

 Zinowitz, M. Hebrew: תולדות ישיבת מיר (Toldot Yeshivat Mir, Hebrew: The History of Mir Yeshiva). Tel Aviv, 1981.

External links
 [* The Mir Yeshiva before the Holocaust - Yad Vashem website
 The Mir Yeshiva] from The Story of the Jewish Community in Mir An exhibition on the Yad Vashem website.
 Reeva Kimble's "Brief History of the Jews of Mir"

Yeshivas of Belarus
Educational institutions established in 1815
1810s in Belarus
Orthodox Judaism in Belarus
Jews and Judaism in Shanghai
Mir, Belarus
Jews and Judaism in Japan
Polish diaspora in Asia
1815 establishments in the Russian Empire
Pre-World War II European yeshivas
Mir Yeshiva